Maale can mean:
 Maale, Maldives, a first-order administrative division of the Maldives
 the Male people, an ethnic group in Ethiopia, and 
 the Male language, the language of the Male people